The Super Nintendo Entertainment System has a library of  official releases, of which 721 were released in North America plus 4 championship cartridges, 522 in Europe, 1,448 in Japan, 231 on Satellaview, and 13 on Sufami Turbo. 295 releases are common to all regions, 148 were released in Japan and the US only, 165 in Europe and the US, and 28 in Japan and Europe. There are 978 Japanese exclusives, 110 US exclusives, and 34 European exclusives.

The Super NES was released in North America on August 23, 1991, with its launch titles being Super Mario World, F-Zero, Pilotwings, Gradius III and SimCity. The last game to be officially published on a physical cartridge was Fire Emblem: Thracia 776 on January 21, 2000 – with the last game officially made and Nintendo-published during the system's lifespan being Metal Slader Glory: Director's Cut on November 29, 2000, via the Nintendo Power downloadable cartridge system. In North America the final first-party game on the SNES was Kirby's Dream Land 3 released November 27, 1997. The best-selling game is Super Mario World with over 20.6 million units sold. Despite the console's relatively late start, and the fierce competition it faced in North America and Europe from Sega's Genesis/Mega Drive console, it was the best-selling console of its era.

Games were released in plastic-encased ROM cartridges. The cartridges are shaped differently for different regions; North American cartridges have a rectangular bottom with inset grooves matching protruding tabs in the console, while other regions' cartridges are narrower with a smooth curve on the front and no grooves. The physical incompatibility can be overcome with use of various adapters, or through modification of the console. Internally, a regional lockout chip within the console and in each cartridge prevents PAL region games from being played on Japanese or North American consoles and vice versa. This can be overcome through the use of adapters, typically by inserting the imported cartridge in one slot and a cartridge with the correct region chip in a second slot. Alternatively, disconnecting one pin of the console's lockout chip will prevent it from locking the console, although hardware in later games can detect this situation.

The list is initially organized alphabetically by their English titles or their alphabet conversions, but it is also possible to sort each column individually. It is arranged with the different titles being listed once for each program that it contains; the various titles are listed by the majority name first. When two English regions released a game with different names, the title in the region it was first released is listed first. All English titles are listed first, with an alternate title listed afterward.

List 

† Also released in South Korea
‡ Released worldwide in an emulated format via Collection of Mana

Championship games

Unlicensed games
For cancelled games see List of cancelled Super NES and Super Famicom games. Only two of the unlicensed games were released during the console's lifespan. The others were produced much later.

References

Super Nintendo Entertainment System
Super Nintendo Entertainment System
 
Super Nintendo Entertainment System